The Naugatuck Valley League was a minor league baseball league that played in the 1896 season. The Non-Signatory Independent level league consisted of franchises based exclusively in Connecticut. The six–team league evolved into the 1897 Connecticut League.

Baseball Hall of Fame member Candy Cummings managed the 1896 Torrington Tornados team in the Naugatuck Valley League. Fellow Hall of Fame member Jim O'Rourke was the Naugatuck Valley League founder and owner/player/manager for the Bridgeport team while leading the league in batting average.

Today, the league name has been adopted by the high school athletic Naugatuck Valley League, based in Connecticut.

History
Formed for the 1896 season, with league founder Jim O'Rourke helping organize the league teams, the Naugatuck Valley League began play on May 6, 1896, as a six–team league. The Naugatuck Valley League was a Non-Signatory Independent level league under league president D.W. Porter.

The league name derived from the location of member teams within the Naugatuck River Valley region in Connecticut.

The Naugatuck Valley League vegan minor league play in 1896. The six charter members were the Ansonia Blues based in Ansonia, Connecticut, the Bridgeport Victors from Bridgeport, Connecticut, the Derby Angels from Derby, Connecticut, the New Haven Edgewoods from New Haven, Connecticut, the Torrington Tornadoes from Torrington, Connecticut and Winsted Welcomes from Winsted, Connecticut.

The Naugatuck Valley League standings were led by the 1st place Bridgeport Victors with a 25–15 record. Bridgeport finished 1.0 games ahead of the 2nd place Torrington Tornados (24–17), followed by the Derby Angels (22–18), New Haven Edgewoods (22–18), Winsted Welcomes (15–25) and Ansonia Blues (12–28). After the season, the Naugatuck Valley League permanently folded, playing only the 1896 season. Baseball Hall of Fame member Candy Cummings was a manager for the Torrington Tornados team.

Baseball Hall of Fame member Jim O'Rourke was owner/player/manager for the Bridgeport team, leading the 1896 Bridgeport Victors to the Naugatuck Valley League championship as a manager and leading the league with a .437 batting average, playing catcher at age 46. O'Rourke had been instrumental in forming both the Bridgeport franchise and the league itself after returning to his hometown of Bridgeport upon ending his major league career. O'Rourke graduated from the nearby Yale Law School in 1887, this after negotiating payment of the college tuition into his major league contract. O'Rourke continued minor league play for Bridgeport teams aging into his late 50's and was a practicing attorney. On July 1, 1903 was joined by his son Jimmy O’Rourke in the lineup for the Bridgeport Orators of the Class D level Connecticut State League, becoming the first known father and son duo to play together in an organized professional baseball game.

After the 1896 season, with Jim O'Rourke still organizing the league, four of the Naugatuck Valley League teams continued play as members of the renamed 1897 Connecticut League. The Bridgeport, Derby, Torrington and Winstead teams continued play in the new league, joined by Bristol and Meriden teams.

Today, the league name has been adopted by the high school athletic Naugatuck Valley League. The league has 16 member high schools, all based in Connecticut.

Naugatuck Valley League franchises

Standings & statistics

1896 Naugatuck Valley League

Baseball Hall of Fame alumni
Candy Cummings, Torrington. Inducted, 1939
Jim O'Rourke, Bridgeport. Inducted, 1945

References

External link
Baseball Reference

Defunct minor baseball leagues in the United States
Baseball leagues in Connecticut
Defunct professional sports leagues in the United States
Sports leagues established in 1896
Sports leagues disestablished in 1896